Jam Filled Entertainment is a Canadian animation studio based in Ottawa, Ontario with additional facilities in Toronto and Halifax and is a division of Boat Rocker Media. It is best known for animating Thomas & Friends between 2013 and 2020 and the Nicktoons The Loud House and its spinoff The Casagrandes.

History
Jam Filled Entertainment was founded in Manotick in 2007 by Kyle MacDougall, Phil Lafrance, and Jamie Leclaire. In January 2011, Jam Filled moved to a new location in Ottawa. On August 3, 2016, Boat Rocker Media acquired Jam Filled Entertainment. On August 22, Jam Filled purchased the assets of Arc Productions, allowing them to expand into creating CGI animation in Toronto. Jam Filled opened a 10,000 square feet studio in Halifax, Nova Scotia in the fall of 2019 to work on more 2D animation projects.

Jam Filled Toronto
The Toronto branch of Jam Filled Entertainment was originally established as Dan Krech Productions on June 24, 1985, as one of the first visual effects companies in Toronto. In 1987, DKP became the first company in Canada to have an in-house digital suite. DKP had produced visual effects and animation for over 2,000 commercials and long-form projects by 2000, many of them for U.S. companies. DKP moved to a new facility on Queen Street East in March 2001. American telecommunications company IDT Corporation acquired DKP Effects on March 16, 2004, leading to the company being renamed DKP Studios.

On 26 May 2006, Liberty Media bought IDT Entertainment from IDT, including Anchor Bay Entertainment and Film Roman, and merged it with the Starz cable network to form Starz Media. Under its new management in 2007, the studio began a "Starz Shortz" program which has produced Bundle of Joy, Enter the Sandbox, Ormie and Lovebirds. In 2007, Starz Animation took over animating Shane Acker's feature 9 from Attitude Studio, Luxembourg. In 2010, the studio opened a major VFX wing to create all the effects for the new Starz Channel/Graham King Productions miniseries, Camelot, Alcon Entertainment's Dolphin Tale, and producer Avi Arad's family feature, Robosapien: Rebooted.

In April 2011, Liberty Starz sold Starz Animation to a Canadian consortium, and it was renamed Arc Productions. Under the new owner, the studio was planning to do more proprietary production. 

On August 1, 2016, Arc Productions announced that they were closing down the studio because they were filing for bankruptcy and locked out over 500 employees after telling them there was a payroll glitch and no one had been paid. On August 10, 2016, following Arc's closure, Jam Filled Entertainment entered an agreement to acquire Arc Productions' assets in which they call "substantially all of the business". Jam Filled Entertainment also acquired 248 of Arc's former employees. Later on August 22, 2016, Arc Productions was reopened as Jam Filled Entertainment's Toronto facility.

In 2020, Jam Filled announced that they would no longer animate episodes of the original Thomas & Friends series after the 24th and final series, with Nelvana taking over for the 2D-animated reboot series, Thomas & Friends: All Engines Go.

Productions

Jam Filled Entertainment

Arc Productions
Formerly known as Dan Krech Productions, DKP Effects, DKP Studios (IDT Entertainment), and Starz Animation

Dan Krech Productions
 Eve of Destruction (1991) (post-production)
 High Tide (1994) (title design & graphics)
 Far from Home: The Adventures of Yellow Dog (1995) (special effects)
 National Lampoon's Senior Trip (1995) (special effects)
 Bogus (1996) (special effects)
 The Siege (1998)
 The Nuttiest Nutcracker (1999; with Columbia TriStar Home Video)
 X-Men (2000)
 CyberWorld (2000)
 Joseph: King of Dreams (2000) (3D effects)

DKP Effects
 Picture Claire (2001) (main titles)
 Space Station 3D (2002)
 The First $20 Million Is Always the Hardest (2002) (special effects)
 My Little Pony G3 (2002; with SD Entertainment, Fat Rock Entertainment, and Hasbro) (TV pilot)
 3-2-1 Penguins! (2002-2003; with Big Idea Productions)
 Scourge of Worlds: A Dungeons & Dragons Adventure (2003) (special effects)
 My Little Pony G3 (2003-2004; with Hasbro) (TV commercials)

DKP Studios
 Game Over (2004)
 The Librarian: Quest for the Spear (2004)
 Nerf N-Strike (2004; with Hasbro)
 VeggieTales (2004–05; with Big Idea Productions)
 My Little Pony G3 (2004-2006; with Hasbro) (TV commercials)
 Shoebox Zoo (2004-2005; with Blueprint Entertainment, BBC Scotland, and Alberta Filmworks) (TV)
 Bratz (2004-2006; with MGA Entertainment and 4Kids Entertainment) (TV specials)
 Surly Squirrel (2005) (short film)
 The Happy Elf (2005)
 Everyone's Hero (2006; with 20th Century Fox)

Starz Animation

 VeggieTales (2006–07; with Big Idea Productions)
 The Reef (2006; with The Weinstein Company, WonderWorld Studios, and DigiArt Productions)
 The Pirates Who Don't Do Anything: A VeggieTales Movie (2008; with Universal Pictures and Big Idea Productions)
 Space Chimps (2008; with 20th Century Fox and Vanguard Animation)
 Chop Socky Chooks (2008; with Aardman Animations and Decode Entertainment) (TV)
 9 (2009; with Focus Features and Relativity Media)
 Yes, Virginia (2009) (TV)
 Gnomeo & Juliet (2011; with Touchstone Pictures and Rocket Pictures)
 Camelot (2011) (visual effects)
 The Simpsons ("Condiments" sequence) (2011)

Arc Productions

 Matt Hatter Chronicles (2011)
 Hoodwinked Too! Hood vs. Evil (2011)
 Dolphin Tale (2011)
 Snack Attack (2012) (short film)
 Barbie: Life in the Dreamhouse (2012–2015)
 Halo 4: Forward Unto Dawn (2012) (visual effects)
 Lego Marvel Super Heroes: Maximum Overload (2013)
 Pixie Hollow Bake Off (2013)
 Robosapien: Rebooted (2013)
 Barbie and Her Sisters in A Pony Tale (2013)
 Thomas & Friends: Series 17–20 (2013–2016, with HiT Entertainment) 
 Thomas & Friends: King of the Railway (2013, with HiT Entertainment)
 Thomas & Friends: Tale of the Brave (2014, with HiT Entertainment)
 Thomas & Friends: The Adventure Begins (2015, with HiT Entertainment)
 Little Boy (2015; with Open Road Films and Metonia Films)
 Lost in Oz (pilot; 2015)
 Thomas & Friends: Sodor's Legend of the Lost Treasure (2015, with HiT Entertainment)
 Barbie and Her Sisters in the Great Puppy Adventure (2015)
 Lego Marvel Super Heroes: Avengers Reassembled (2015)
 Before I Wake (2016) (special effects)
 Ice Age: The Great Egg-Scapade (2016)
 Thomas & Friends: The Great Race (2016, with HiT Entertainment)
 Elena of Avalor (2016)
 Barbie: Star Light Adventure (2016)
 Trollhunters: Tales of Arcadia (2016)
 Tarzan and Jane (2017)

References

External links 
 
 

Canadian animation studios
Companies based in Ottawa
Television production companies of Canada
Canadian companies established in 2007
Mass media companies established in 2007
2007 establishments in Ontario
Former Liberty Media subsidiaries
Former Lionsgate subsidiaries
2016 mergers and acquisitions